is a railway station on the Kagoshima Main Line, operated by JR Kyushu in Miyama, Fukuoka Prefecture, Japan.

Lines 
Only local services on the line stop at the station.

Layout 
The station consists of two side platforms serving two tracks. The platforms are not opposed. Platform 2 was formerly an island platform but the centre track between it and platform 1 has been removed. The station building is a modern concrete building but has been built in traditional Japanese style with a double tiled roof. It houses a waiting room, a ticket window,  an automatic ticket vending machine, a Sugoca charge machine and card reader. There is an accessibility ramp to the station building, but a footbridge is needed to access platform 2.

Adjacent stations

History
In the next phase of expansion, the track was extended south with Takase (now  opening as the new southern terminus on 1 April 1891. Wataze was opened a few months later, on 7 June 1891, as an additional station between Kurume and Takase. When the Kyushu Railway was nationalized on 1 July 1907, Japanese Government Railways (JGR) took over control of the station. On 12 October 1909, the station became part of the Hitoyoshi Main Line and then on 21 November 1909, part of the Kagoshima Main Line. With the privatization of Japanese National Railways (JNR), the successor of JGR, on 1 April 1987, JR Kyushu took over control of the station.

References

External links
Wataze Station (JR Kyushu)

Railway stations in Fukuoka Prefecture
Railway stations in Japan opened in 1891